The 2008–09 Anglo-Welsh Cup, known as the EDF Energy Cup for sponsorship reasons, was the 38th season of England's national rugby union cup competition, and the fourth to follow the recently adopted Anglo-Welsh format.

As in the previous two years, the competition is contested between the twelve teams of the Guinness Premiership and the four Welsh regions from the Celtic League. The sixteen teams are arranged into four pools, with one Welsh and three English teams in each. Teams are randomly drawn into groups, as opposed to previous years when English sides were grouped according to proximity to one another. Each team plays the other team from their group only once, meaning that two teams in each group face two away games, whereas the other two teams have two home games.

Group stage
In the pool matches, teams receive:
 Four points for a win
 Two points for a draw
 A bonus point for scoring four or more tries, regardless of the match result
 A bonus point for losing by seven or fewer points

The winner of each pool advances to the semi-finals, at which stage a draw takes place to determine the teams that will play each other. The winners of the semi-final advance to the final to determine the competition winner; no "third place final" is played.

Group A

Group B

Group C

Group D

 This was the Scarlets' last competitive match at Stradey Park, home to Llanelli RFC since 1879. The new Parc y Scarlets opened in November.

Semi-finals

Final

See also 
2008–09 English Premiership (rugby union)
2008–09 Celtic League

External links
 EDF Energy Cup Homepage
 Live Scores from EDF Energy Cup Site

2008–09 in Welsh rugby union
2008–09 English Premiership (rugby union)
2008-09
2008–09 rugby union tournaments for clubs